Blood Hook is a 1986 American slasher film directed by Jim Mallon and starring Mark Jacobs, Lisa Todd, Patrick Danz, Sara Hauser, and Christopher Whiting. It follows a group of young people who arrive in a small northern Wisconsin town during a fishing festival, where a series of bizarre disappearances and murders are occurring. It was distributed by Troma Entertainment. The film was premiered at the MIFED Film Market in October 1986. The film was truncated for its 1987 release after the Motion Picture Association of America threatened to grant the film an X rating due to its violent content.

Plot 
While at his family's lakeside lodge in northern Wisconsin, six-year-old Peter van Cleese witnesses his grandfather mysteriously become overtaken by an apparent supernatural force while fishing on the dock. He falls into the lake, and his body is never recovered.

Seventeen years later, Peter, now a recent college graduate, has inherited the lodge. He decides to travel there with his group of friends—Ann Colbert, Kiersten, Rodney, and Finner—for the first time since his grandfather's disappearance. The group arrive during "Muskie Madness," an annual fishing festival in the local community. At the lodge, the group are met by Wayne Duerst, a neighbor hired by the Van Cleese's to look after the property since Peter's grandfather's death. Wayne and his paranoid Vietnam veteran grandson, Evelyn, are hostile toward the group.

While Peter and his friends visit local restaurant that evening, middle-aged tourist Sheila Swain is attacked on a nearby dock by an assailant who entangles her with a large fishing line, and pulls her into the lake. The next day, Rodney and Tom become acquainted with young mother Beverly Duerst—Evelyn's wife—who helps to organize the fishing festival. Rodney visits a local fishing shop run by Leory Leudke. Leudke tells Rodney a story about how Peter's grandfather and Wayne used to catch trophy fish by reeling them to shore and shooting them, but stopped after Wayne accidentally shot Peter with a bullet. Meanwhile, Peter grows increasingly unnerved being near the lake where his grandfather drowned. Ann tries to comfort him, and believes him to be experiencing post-traumatic stress disorder.

Rodney takes a boat out on the lake by himself, and is attacked by an unseen assailant, who castrates him with a large fishing hook before dragging him into the water with the fishing line. Police find the blood-soaked empty boat floating on the lake, and Peter insists that Evelyn is responsible. The local sheriff, however, attempts to stymie the investigation to prevent any disruption of the pending festival. A distraught Kiersten decides to relax by floating on the lake, but a large hook is thrown in her direction. Meanwhile, Finner and Beverly spend the afternoon together, and become romantic.

That night, while the locals hold a contest for who has caught the largest muskie, fisherman Denny Dobkins is stranded on the lake when his boat motor malfunctions. He sounds an emergency horn for help, but is gored by a large fishing hook cast at his abdomen, and pulled into the lake. Shortly after, Beverly goes for a swim alone, and is also attacked with a large hook and dragged beneath the surface. Peter and Ann attempt to locate Kiersten. A ranting and raving Evelyn confronts them, informing them that Bev is also missing. Meanwhile, an intoxicated Finner takes a boat onto the lake, playing music loudly from a boombox. The music, combined with the incessant chirping of cicadas, drives Leudke mad in his nearby bait shop—the sound penetrates through a metal plate in his head, which he had implanted after suffering a brain injury in the Korean War. In a rage, Leudke casts a fishing hook at Finner, and tears off his ear. Finner jumps into the water, but is accosted by a raving Leudke, who dismembers him and grinds his limbs to be used for fishing bait.

A panicked, exhausted Kiersten finally returns to the lodge, and tells Peter how she was attacked with a large fish hook, and managed to elude it by swimming to the other end of the lake, where she became lost in the woods. Peter, a music major, eventually surmises that that sound of the cicadas combined with certain musical notes can create what is known as the "Devil's tritone," a frequency that has the ability to drive some people insane. Evelyn suggests that the metal plate in Leudke's head could amplify these sounds, which would become overpowering, a phenomenon he witnessed amongst his fellow veterans. Peter and Evelyn investigate Leudke's shack, where they find jars of human organs.

While Peter and Evelyn rush back to the lodge, Ann is attacked by Leudke while sitting alone on a dock playing music, and he manages to capture her and bring her back to his bait shop. She tries to reason with him to no avail, and he locks her in a refrigerator. Wayne teams with Evelyn and Peter to stop Leudke. The next morning at the fishing festival, when Leudke wins the contest, Wayne publicly accuses him of being the murderer, but the sheriff doesn't believe him. That night, Peter faces off with Leudke at this shack, severely injuring him with a treble hook, but Leudke manages to incapacitate Peter. Peter awakens in Leudke's shack, and manages to free Ann. Leudke prepares to stab them both to death, but flees when he hears police sirens.

At dawn, Peter and Ann leave town. Wayne and the sheriff search the woods for Leudke, but cannot locate him. The sheriff surmises he will likely die of blood loss due to his injury.

Cast

Production

Filming
The film was shot on location in the community of Hayward, Wisconsin over a period of 35 days in the summer of 1985, on a budget of $200,000. The town's landmark giant fiberglass muskie is prominently featured in the film.

Release 
Blood Hook was intended to be released in 1986, but was delayed after the Motion Picture Association of America threatened to give the film an X rating, after which the producers truncated the film to eliminate portions of its violence and gore.

Home media
The film has been released on VHS by several companies including Paramount Home Entertainment and Troma Entertainment. It was released on DVD as part of the Troma Triple B-Header set in 2004.

In 2012 Troma posted the movie for free online viewing on their official TromaMovies YouTube channel.

In May 2018, a Blu-ray version featuring a new 2k scan of the original 16mm camera negative was released by Vinegar Syndrome, featuring an extended 111-minute cut of the film. The first 1,000 copies featured a limited edition slip cover. In January 2022, Troma Entertainment released their own Blu-ray edition of the film, also featuring the extended cut.

Notes

References

External links 
 
 

1986 films
1986 horror films
1986 directorial debut films
1980s comedy horror films
1980s slasher films
American comedy horror films
American independent films
American serial killer films
American slasher films
Backwoods slasher films
Films about fishing
Films shot in Wisconsin
Films set in Wisconsin
Films set in 1968
Films set in 1985
Parodies of horror
Slasher comedy films
Troma Entertainment films
1980s English-language films
1980s American films
Films shot in 16 mm film